Trams of Putilov plant - wagons of series F (Fonarniy), MS (Motorny Stalnoy) and PS (Pritsepnoy Stalnoy), made by Putilov plant in Saint Petersburg.

Models

F
Full motor wagon. There were six rectangular windows of conventional type. Headlamps absent, they replace a pair of searchlights, suspended from the bottom to the roof of the two sites wagon.

MS-1

Bilateral wagon with two cabins. Head-sheets have rounded forms. Number of seats - 24. Available in 1927.

PS
Wagon on a bilateral free axles without bogies. The diameter wheels smaller than MS. Venue shorter than that of MS. Available in 1929.

MS-2

Tram MS-2 at Staro-Nicholas Bridge in St. Petersburg. 

Bilateral wagon with two cabins. Handrails at the entrance to the salon (no doors), open platform. Head-sheets have a flat shape.

MS-3

Bilateral wagon with two cabins. Closed sites, indoor saloon. Head-sheets have a flat shape. Number of seats - 24.

MSP-3

Bilateral wagon with two cabins. Closed sites, indoor saloon. Head-sheets have a flat shape. Number of seats - 24.

MS-4

Bilateral wagon with two cabins. Closed sites, indoor saloon. Head-sheets have a flat shape. Number of seats - 24.

МСО-4

Unilateral wagon with one cabin. Closed sites, indoor saloon. Head-sheets have a flat shape. Number of seats - 27.

MSP-4
Bilateral wagon with two cabins without a motor. Closed sites, indoor saloon. Head-sheets have a flat shape.

Geographical Spread
Putilov plant's trams were used in Almaty, Astrakhan, Biysk, Vladikavkaz, Zaporozhye, Irkutsk, Izhevsk, Kalinin, Kirovabad, Krasnodar, Kuybyshev, Kursk, Lipetsk, Leningrad, Minsk, Nizhny Novgorod, Nizhny Tagil, Novokuznetsk, Novorossiysk, Sverdlovsk, Simferopol, Taganrog, Temirtau and Ufa.

Current state
So far, the museum electrical transport in Saint Petersburg survived several copies of MS-1, MS-2, an MSP-3, several MS-4 and an MSO-4. Several cars MS has been used in Saint Petersburg as an official.

References

External links

F at site «Нижегородский Трамвай-Троллейбус» 
MS at site «Нижегородский Трамвай-Троллейбус» 
MS trams at site «Ретро-трамвай - петербургская классика.»: MS-1, MS-4, MSO-4, MS-4 and MSP-3. 

Soviet tram vehicles